Jack Bruce (1 July 1926 – 6 April 1956) was an  Australian rules footballer who played with South Melbourne in the Victorian Football League (VFL).

Notes

External links 

1926 births
1956 deaths
Australian rules footballers from Victoria (Australia)
Sydney Swans players